This is a list of New Zealand television-related events in 1989.

Events
3 April – Network News at Six was reduced in duration from an hour to 30 minutes; Holmes premiered on TV One and screened at 6.30pm (right after Network News at Six); and the regional news programmes – Top Half (Auckland), Today Tonight (Wellington), The Mainland Touch (Christchurch) and The South Tonight (Dunedin) – were transferred to Network Two at 5.45pm.
3 April – New Zealand quiz show Sale of the Century premiered and screened weeknights at 7pm on Network Two (right after the Australian soap Neighbours). By the end of July, the show was transferred to TV One and Neighbours was moved to a 'double episode' format from 6.30-7.30pm.
August – Network Two was renamed as Channel 2. Despite the name being used as "Channel 2", it was seen on screen as just "Network Two" until October.
October – A new look for Channel 2 was unveiled.
6 November – Breakfast television – weekdays from 6.30am and weekends from 7am – was introduced to Channel 2 with an early morning news service called Breakfast News with Tom Bradley as anchor and Penelope Barr as weather presenter. Breakfast News initially aired as a half hour bulletin on Channel 2 at 7am, with a five-minute news and weather update at 8am, before switching to five-minute news and weather bulletins at 7am, 7.30am, 8am and 8.30am by January 1990. Cartoons, Sesame Street and British sitcom reruns were shown throughout the morning, although Sesame Street was still shown on Tuesday and Thursday afternoons until December 1989, and Aerobics Oz Style and the US soaps Santa Barbara and Days of Our Lives were transferred from TV One to Channel 2.
11 November – Saturday morning television was introduced to Channel 2 with a brand new wrapper programme called The Breakfast Club with Jason Gunn as host. What Now and other children's programmes on weekend mornings were transferred from TV One to Channel 2.
26 November – TV3 commenced broadcasting with a two-hour Grand Preview from 8pm.
27 November – TV3's regular programming began at 7am with The Early Bird Show and news updates on the half hour.
5 December – Australian soap Home and Away premiered in New Zealand with the series initially transmitting on TV3 in a double episode format on Tuesdays and Wednesdays at 7.30-8.30pm.
8 December – The final editions of Top Half (Auckland) and Today Tonight (Wellington) were broadcast on Channel 2 at 5.45pm.

Debuts

Domestic
13 February – After 2 (Network Two) (1989-1991)
13 February – 3:45 Live (Network Two) (1989-1990)
2 April – CV (Network Two) (1989)
3 April – Holmes (TV One) (1989-2004)
3 April – Sale of the Century (Network Two) (1989-1993)
5 April – Shark in the Park (TV One) (1989-1991)
13 April – Missing (TV One) (1989)
7 May – LIFE (Life in the Fridge Exists) (Network Two) (1989-1991)
12 June – The Mostly Useful Job Guide (Network Two) (1989)
18 June – Don't Tell Me (Network Two) (1989)
18 June – Strangers (Network Two) (1989)
9 July – The Shadow Trader (Network Two) (1989)
15 July – Space Knights (Network Two) (1989)
30 July – Hotshotz (Network Two) (1989)
10 September – Night of the Red Hunter (Network Two) (1989)
14 September – Ten Out of Ten (Network Two) (1989-1990)
30 September – Saturday Live (Network Two) (1989-1990)
8 October – The Champion (Channel 2) (1989)
30 October – Blind Date (Channel 2) (1989-1991)
11 November – The Breakfast Club (Channel 2) (1989-1991)
27 November – The Early Bird Show (TV3) (1989-1992)
27 November – LaughINZ (TV3) (1989-1990)
27 November – Perfect Match (TV3) (1989-1990)
1 December – Letter to Blanchy (TV3) (1989)
3 December – Country Kiwi and the Cool City Cat (Channel 2) (1989)

International
8 January –  Probe (Network Two) 
13 January –  The Survival Factor (Network Two) 
12 February –   The Adventures of Snelgrove Snail (TV One)
12 February –  TUGS (TV One)
1 April –  TV 101 (Network Two) 
1 April –  AlfTales (TV One)
3 April –  A Little Princess (1986) (Network Two) 
3 April –  The Duck Factory (Network Two) 
3 April –  Storybook Classics (Network Two) 
3 April – / Jim Henson's Mother Goose Stories (Network Two) 
5 April –  Dear John (USA) (Network Two) 
5 April –  No Frills (TV One)
6 April –  Stoppit and Tidyup (TV One)
7 April –  Mission: Impossible (1988) (Network Two) 
25 April –  Jem (Network Two) 
27 April –  Count Duckula (Network Two) 
29 April –  Saturday Night Clive (TV One)
7 May –  Tube Mice (TV One)
7 May –  Tumbledown Farm (TV One)
14 May –  Return Journey (TV One)
14 May –  Duet (Network Two) 
14 May –  Live at City Hall (TV One)
16 May –  Charlie Chalk (TV One)
30 May –  Gruey (Network Two) 
3 June –  J.J. Starbuck (Network Two) 
3 June –  A Bit of a Do (TV One)
4 June –  For the Love of Richard (TV One)
4 June –  Heirs and Grace (TV One)
5 June – // The Blood of Others (Network Two) 
7 June –  Streets Apart (TV One)
11 June –  Six Women Writers (TV One)
11 June –  Colin's Sandwich (TV One)
15 June –  Paradise (Network Two) 
26 June –  China Beach (Network Two) 
28 June –  Hannay (TV One)
29 June –  Poor Little Rich Girl: The Barbara Hutton Story (Network Two)
30 June –  Chish 'n' Fips (Network Two) 
2 July –   Gran (TV One)
4 July –  Surgical Spirit (TV One)
5 July – / Max Headroom (Network Two) 
5 July –  The Tin Soldier (Network Two) 
19 July –  Joint Account (TV One)
21 July –  Dusty (Network Two) 
26 July –  Annie McGuire (Network Two) 
26 July –  Four Hours in My Lai (TV One)
5 August –  The Prodigious Hickey (Channel 2) 
9 August –  Day by Day (Channel 2) 
9 August –  The Consultant (TV One)
10 August –  Hothouse (Channel 2) 
14 August –  Rockliffe's Folly (TV One)
16 August –  The Boy in the Bush (Channel 2) 
19 August –  Poker Alice (Channel 2)  
19 August –  The Impossible Spy (TV One)
22 August –  Starring the Actors (Channel 2) 
31 August –  Bottle Boys (TV One)
1 September – / Hello Kitty's Furry Tale Theater (TV One)
2 September –  Aaron's Way (Channel 2) 
3 September –  A Pup Named Scooby-Doo (TV One)
7 September –  The Comedy Company (Channel 2) 
7 September – / Denver, the Last Dinosaur (Channel 2) 
13 September –  Round the Bend (Channel 2) 
25 September –  Piece of Cake (TV One)
4 October –  The New Yogi Bear Show (Channel 2) 
4 October –  Imaginary Friends (TV One)
4 October –  Two by Two (TV One)
9 October –  Nightingales (Channel 2) 
27 October –  Doris (Channel 2) 
30 October – / City Lights (TV One)
30 October –  The Man Who Lived at the Ritz (Channel 2) 
2 November –  Mr Majeika (Channel 2) 
3 November –  Terror at London Bridge (Channel 2) 
5 November –  The Show Boat Story (Channel 2) 
6 November –  Strike It Rich (TV One)
6 November – / Babar (Channel 2)
6 November –  Glass Babies (Channel 2) 
9 November –  Grimm's Fairy Tale Classics (Channel 2) 
9 November – // Fantastic Max (Channel 2) 
10 November –  Fraggle Rock: The Animated Series (Channel 2) 
12 November –  Jim Henson's The Storyteller (Channel 2) 
21 November – / My Pet Monster (Channel 2) 
27 November –  Garfield and Friends (TV3)
27 November – / Dennis the Menace (1986) (TV3)
27 November – / Dinosaucers (TV3)
27 November –  The Mickey Mouse Club (1989) (TV3)
27 November –  The Real Ghostbusters (TV3)
27 November –  Teenage Mutant Ninja Turtles (1987) (TV3)
27 November –  The Shiralee (TV3)
28 November –  The Nutt House (TV3)
1 December –  In the Heat of the Night (TV3)
2 December –  Mighty Mouse and Friends (TV3)
2 December –  Family Matters (TV3)
2 December –  Midnight Caller (TV3)
2 December –  High Mountain Rangers (TV3)
3 December –  Murphy Brown (TV3)
4 December –  The Shoe People (TV One)
5 December –  Home and Away (TV3)
7 December –  Houston Knights (TV3)
8 December –  Empty Nest (TV3)
8 December –  Baby Boom (Channel 2) 
8 December –  Hey Dad..! (TV3)
8 December –  Rafferty's Rules (TV3)
10 December –  Barney (Channel 2) 
10 December –  It's Punky Brewster (TV3)
10 December –  My Secret Identity (TV3)
10 December –  Voltron (TV3)
10 December –  Chocky (TV3)
20 December –  Have Faith (TV One)
30 December – / East of the Moon (Channel 2) 
30 December –  Morris Goes to School (Channel 2) 
 Dadah is Death (Channel 2)

New channels
26 November – TV3

Changes to network affiliation
This is a list of programs which made their premiere on a New Zealand television network that had previously premiered on another New Zealand television network. The networks involved in the switch of allegiances are predominantly both free-to-air networks or both subscription television networks. Programs that have their free-to-air/subscription television premiere, after previously premiering on the opposite platform (free-to air to subscription/subscription to free-to air) are not included. In some cases, programs may still air on the original television network. This occurs predominantly with programs shared between subscription television networks.

Domestic

International

Television shows
Play School (1972–1990)
University Challenge (1976–1989, 2014–present)
What Now (1981–present)
Gloss (1987–1990)
Betty's Bunch (1989)
Blind Date (1989–1991)
The Early Bird Show (1989–1992)
Shark in the Park (1989–1992)
After 2 (1989–1991)
3:45 Live (1989–1990)

Ending this year
16 April – Worzel Gummidge Down Under (also United Kingdom) (1987–1989)
5 November – University Challenge (1976–1989, 2014–present)
Betty's Bunch (1989)

 
1980s in New Zealand television